The 1926–27 Clarkson Golden Knights men's ice hockey season was the 7th season of play for the program. The team was coached by Gordon Croskery in his 4th season.

Season
The potential that Clarkson had shown in the second half of last season was fully realized this year. With all of their principle players returning and several more being welcomed in, the Golden Knights got off to a hot start against Cornell. "String" Macartney opened the scoring while new entry Harrison Heintzman netted the game-winner at the end of the second period. The team was short-handed when they met Hamilton a week later, missing both Dion and Heintzman, but gave the Continentals a fight. The teams battled to a 2–2 draw after 60 minutes but Tech fell in the extra session.

The team was back at full strength for the following match, a continuation of their brand-new rivalry with St. Lawrence, and Clarkson really let the Larries have it. The Knights beat the Saints 10–1 with captain Wayland scoring a hat-trick from the blueline. The team then headed to Brooklyn to face NYU in their opponent's first game in 14 years. The Violets' goaltender, Vye, put up a tremendous effort, limiting Clarkson to just 3 goals in the game. The NYU offense, however, could only muster 3 shots on Klube for the entire match and Tech easily shut out the Violets. On their way home, Clarkson stopped in West Point and received a hard test from Army. The Knights got out to an early lead but the Cadets tied the game at 3-all in the second. After exchanging goals in the third, Clarkson played its second overtime game of the season. Northup netted the go-ahead goal 2 minutes into the frame and then the entire team played defense for the remainder of the 10-minute session to secure their fourth win on the year.

Coach Croskery had more than a week to work with the team before their next match and he had them in fine form when they hosted Syracuse. The Orange had won both of the previous games between the two, but Clarkson wouldn't let that trend continue; Tech swamped Syracuse in front of about 800 fans at home to the tune of 8–0. Wayland ended up with his second hat-trick on the year but Heintzman finished one goal better. Their third and final home game of the year occurred over that weekend when Vermont arrived in town. The game was slowed by poor ice conditions but Tech was still able to pump 5 goals into the cage, easily carrying the match.

Clarkson rounded out its season with two rematch games over the next couple of weeks. The first was at Syracuse, where the teams were limited to three 15-minute periods, but Tech continued their winning streak with a solid 4–1 victory. The second was against St. Lawrence and the Knights faced a far tougher task than they had the first time around. The Saints' defense had vastly improved over the course of the season and they held Clarkson off of the scoresheet for the first half of the match. Fortunately for Clarkson, their defense was just as impenetrable. The stronger legs of the Knights showed as the game went on and eventually they broke through. "Chesty" Northup broke the tie in the second and then added another in the third, allowing Clarkson to earn its seventh-consecutive win and third shutout on the year.

With much of the team returning for next season, there were now high expectations for the Knights.

Roster

Standings

Schedule and Results

|-
!colspan=12 style=";" | Regular Season

Scoring Statistics

Note: Assists were not recorded as a statistic.

Goaltending statistics

Note: GAA is based upon 60 minutes per game.

References

Clarkson Golden Knights men's ice hockey seasons
Clarkson
Clarkson
Clarkson
Clarkson